The Raymond J. Harbert College of Business, commonly shortened to Harbert College is the business school of Auburn University in Auburn, Alabama. Founded in 1967, it grants both undergraduate and graduate degrees, and is one of the university's nine constituent schools. Since 2013, the school has been named in honor of Auburn alumnus Raymond J. Harbert. The business school has over 6,000 students, 73 full-time faculty (157 total full-time staff), and over 53,000 graduates. It is one of the largest business schools in the Southeastern United States.

History 

Established in 1967 as a business school by Auburn University's board of trustees, the school expanded its curriculum and was renamed as a college in 1985. The college was renamed the Raymond J. Harbert College of Business in June 2013 in honor of alumnus Raymond J. Harbert's $40 million donation to the school. In 2016, Raymond and Kathryn Harbert made a $15 million donation to fund a planned 80,000-square-foot business building on Auburn's campus.

In January 2018 Dean Bill Hardgrave stepped down as dean of the college after serving for seven years to take a new position as Auburn's provost and senior vice president for academic affairs. On August 1, 2018, Annette Ranft was announced as the new dean of the college, becoming the seventh dean and first woman to serve as dean of Harbert College of Business.

Enrollment in Harbert College grew by 47 percent from 2010 to 2018.

Academics 

The Harbert College of Business offers several Master of Business Administration programs (full-time MBA, part-time MBA, international MBA, physicians executive MBA and online MBA); several other master's degree programs; and several Ph.D. programs, including in accountancy, finance, marketing, international business, entrepreneurship, management of information systems, risk management and insurance, strategic management, and sports.

In June 2020, Harbert College created a new department for Supply Chain Management. Prior to the formation of the new department, Harbert's supply chain management degree had been ranked third in the nation by Gartner.

Rankings 

As of 2018, the college has seven programs ranked in the top ten in the nation.

Undergraduate School 

The Harbert College of Business undergraduate program has been ranked in the nation across various publications, with the 2022 U.S. News & World Report ranking the business program 49th among all U.S. colleges and 34th among public institutions.

In the 2021 U.S. News & World Report rankings, these undergraduate programs were ranked the following:
 Accounting: 25th                              
 Supply Chain: 20th

Graduate school 

In the 2021 U.S. News & World Report rankings, the Harbert College of Business Master of Business Administration (MBA) program ranked #56 in the U.S. (top 30 among public universities). The Financial Times ranked Harbert College of Business Executive Master of Business Administration (EMBA) program #99 globally (#21 of programs based in the U.S.) in 2020. In 2020, The Princeton Review ranked Harbert's online MBA program #19 in the nation and also ranked Harbert as the #2 best business school for minority students.  

In 2014 U.S. News & World Report ranked the MBA program #2 in the nation in terms of best financial value.

Notable Faculty and Alumni 
 Donald J. Boudreaux (1986), economist
 John Brown (1957), former CEO and chairman of the board, Stryker Corporation
 Joe Forehand (1971), former chairman and CEO of Accenture
 John M. Harbert (1946), businessman and founder of Harbert Corporation
 Raymond J. Harbert (1982), founder, chairman and CEO of Harbert Management Corporation; trustee; namesake of the Raymond J. Harbert College of Business
 Don Logan (1966), former CEO of Time Inc.; former chairman of Time Warner Cable
 Mark Spencer (1999), president and CEO of Digium, creator of Asterisk PBX
 Mark Thornton (1989 Ph.D.), economist
 Jimmy Wales (1989), co-founder of Wikipedia
 Arthur L. Williams, Jr. (M.S.), insurance executive
 Elmer Beseler Harris, business executive at Alabama Power
 Chetan Sankar, Emeritus professor of Management Information Systems
 Quentin Riggins, business executive at Alabama Power
 Michael S. Rogers, United States Navy admiral and director of the National Security Agency
 Jack Driscoll, NFL offensive tackle for the Philadelphia Eagles
 John E. Hyten, United States Air Force general
 Harold Melton, Chief Justice of the Georgia Supreme Court
 Jeannie Leavitt, United States Air Force general officer and first woman fighter pilot in the USAF
 Lawrence F. Haygood, Jr., mayor of Tuskegee, Alabama
 Mohamed Mansour, Egyptian billionaire chairman of Mansour Group
 Youssef Mansour, Egyptian billionaire businessman, co-owner of Mansour Group
 Richard Myers, retired four-star general in the United States Air Force who served as the 15th Chairman of the Joint Chiefs of Staff
 Stacy Brown, founder of Chicken Salad Chick
 Joe Hortiz, NFL, Director of Player Personnel for the Baltimore Ravens.

See also
List of United States business school rankings
List of business schools in the United States

References

External links 

1967 establishments in Alabama
Alabama Cooperative Extension System

Buildings and structures in Auburn, Alabama
Education in Lee County, Alabama
Educational institutions established in 1967
Landmarks in Alabama
Universities and colleges accredited by the Southern Association of Colleges and Schools